The girls' futsal tournament at the 2018 Summer Youth Olympics takes place in Buenos Aires, Argentina between 7–17 October 2018.

Squads

Each team had to name a preliminary squad of 20 players (minimum three must be goalkeepers). From the preliminary squad, the team had to name a final squad of 10 players (minimum two must be goalkeepers) by the FIFA deadline.

Group stage

Group C

Group D

Knockout stage

Bracket

Semi-finals

Bronze medal match

Gold medal match

Overall ranking

Goalscorers

References

External links

Futsal Schedule and Results , Buenos Aires 2018
Youth Olympic Futsal Tournaments Buenos Aires 2018 - Women, FIFA.com

Futsal at the 2018 Summer Youth Olympics